The Steavenson River, sometimes incorrectly referred to as Steavensons River, a minor inland perennial river of the Goulburn Broken catchment, part of the Murray-Darling basin, is located in the lower South Eastern Highlands bioregion and Northern Country/North Central regions of the Australian state of Victoria. The headwaters of the Steavenson River rise on the northwestern slopes of the Yarra Ranges, below Mount Edgar and descend to flow into the Acheron River near .

Location and features
The river rises below Mount Edgar on the northwestern slopes of the Yarra Ranges, part of the Great Dividing Range, within the Yarra Ranges National Park. The flows generally north by west, through rugged national park as the river descends, then north, joined by three tributaries including the Taggerty River, before reaching its confluence with the Acheron River near the settlement of Buxton. The river descends  over its  course.

The river is crossed by the Maroondah Highway south of Buxton. An anabranch of the river, called Little Steavenson River, splits from the main river and reaches its confluence with the Acheron River, also near the settlement of Buxton.

Much of the catchment area of the river was destroyed by the Black Saturday bushfires that passed through the area on 7 February 2009, destroying almost all of the man made infrastructure and causing extensive damage to the forest in the area.

Etymology
In an Australian Aboriginal language, the river is claimed to be named Nur-ro-nur-ro, with no defined meaning for the name. That claim is disputed.

It is believed that the lower reaches of the Steavenson River, from the confluence of the Taggerty River with the Steavenson River, at the locale of Vic Oak, until the river mouth near Buxton, may have been initially named as the Taggerty River, until the Steavenson was officially named.

See also

References

Goulburn Broken catchment
Rivers of Hume (region)
Tributaries of the Goulburn River